MJ/kg may refer to:
 megajoules per kilogram
 Specific kinetic energy
 Heat of fusion
 Heat of combustion